"We Danced Anyway" is a song written by Randy Scruggs and Matraca Berg, and recorded by American country music artist Deana Carter that reached the top of the Billboard Hot Country Singles & Tracks chart.  It was released in December 1996 as the second single and second Number One hit from her debut album Did I Shave My Legs for This?. The song spent 2 weeks at the top of the Hot Country Singles & Tracks chart, and six non-consecutive weeks at the top of Canada's RPM Country Tracks. It was also the RPM chart number-one single of the year in 1997.

Content
In the lyrics, the singer recounts happy memories of dancing in a "happy little foreign town" with a lover, and invites her lover to dance again.

Music video 
The music video for "We Danced Anyway" was shot in Puerto Rico, and directed by Roger Pistole. Scenes of Carter dancing joyfully on a city street are mixed with scenes of her on a tropical beach. She is seen by herself, but also with her lover as well, and scenes of native islanders are shown as well.

Chart performance
"We Danced Anyway" debuted at number 58 on the U.S. Billboard Hot Country Singles & Tracks for the chart week of December 14, 1996. The song peaked at Number One on the chart in March 1997 becoming Carter's second number one hit overall.

Year-end charts

References

1996 singles
Deana Carter songs
Songs written by Matraca Berg
Songs written by Randy Scruggs
RPM Country Tracks number-one singles of the year
Capitol Records Nashville singles
1996 songs
Song recordings produced by Chris Farren (country musician)